Tephritomyia lauta is a species of tephritid or fruit flies in the genus Tephritomyia of the family Tephritidae.

Distribution
Greece, Israel, Iran, Tunisia, Egypt.

References

Tephritinae
Insects described in 1869
Taxa named by Hermann Loew
Diptera of Africa
Diptera of Asia
Diptera of Europe